Watsa Airport  is an airport serving the town of Watsa in Haut-Uélé Province, Democratic Republic of the Congo.

See also

Transport in the Democratic Republic of the Congo
List of airports in the Democratic Republic of the Congo

References

External links
 HERE Maps - Watsa
 OpenStreetMap - Watsa
 OurAirports - Watsa
 Watsa

Airports in Haut-Uélé